Advanced Pediatric Life Support (APLS) is a program created by the American Academy of Pediatrics and the American College of Emergency Physicians to teach health care providers how to take care of sick children.

Pediatric assessment triangle

The pediatric assessment triangle is one of the core components of the APLS instruction course. Assessment of a sick child is based on a quick examination of their appearance, breathing, and circulation. The appearance is determined by an examination of tone, how interactive the child is, if they are consolable, their gaze, and the quality of their speech or cry.

Topics discussed 
 Pediatric Assessment
 Pediatric Airway in Health and Disease
 Shock
 Cardiovascular System
 Central Nervous System
 Trauma
 Child Maltreatment
 Nontraumatic Surgical Emergencies
 Nontraumatic Orthopedic Emergencies
 Medical Emergencies
 Neonatal Emergencies
 Procedural Sedation and Analgesia
 Children With Special Health Care Needs

 PALS Essentials
 ED and Office Preparedness for Pediatric Emergencies
 Metabolic Disease
 Environmental Emergencies
 Toxicology
 Interface With EMS
 Disaster Management
 Preparedness for Acts of Nuclear, Biological, and Chemical Terrorism
 Ambulatory Orthopedics in the ED
 Medical-Legal Considerations
 Imaging Strategies and Considerations
 Office Procedures
 Critical Procedures

See also
 Pediatric advanced life support (PALS)

References

Further reading
 

Emergency medicine courses
Emergency life support